M4 is a computer game developed by Deadly Games in 1992 for the Macintosh and in 1996 for Windows 3.x.

Plot
M4, also known by its full length name as M4: Sherman Tank Simulator or its German release as M4 Tank Simulator, is a tank simulation where the player is a tank commander for an M4 Sherman tank during World War II.

Gameplay
The game comes with a set of earphones, allowing the player to hear communications from HQ and other units in the battle zone directly to the ears. Game options are point-and-click on a graphic representation of a piece of tank hardware and that is the command to activate. A map overlay allows you the player navigate toward a sector. On the communication screen, the player sets the frequency to listen and respond to commands, weather reports, and other items.

Reception
M4 was reviewed in 1993 in Dragon #193 by Hartley, Patricia, and Kirk Lesser in "The Role of Computers" column. The reviewers gave the game 5 out of 5 stars.

Markus Dahlberg reviewed M4 for Swedish magazine Datormagazin in 1994. Dahlberg felt that the game did recreate the feel of sitting inside a tank to some extent, and that the headphones actually give an authentic feel and the sound was very good.  He felt that the graphics were obsolete, and noted that the radio communication was the only thing in the game that was really good.

References

1992 video games
Classic Mac OS games
Classic Mac OS-only games
Video games developed in the United States